Jackson James White is an American actor. He is best known for his role as Stephen in Tell Me Lies, Brendan Fletcher on Mrs. Fletcher, Ash Baker in the 2017 film SPF-18 and Officer Zach in the 2022 film Ambulance.

Personal Life 
Jackson White was born to actress Katey Sagal and Jack White and was raised back and forth from Los Angeles and Nashville. He has an older sister named Sarah and a younger half-sister named Esme. 

Before beginning a career in acting, he had considered doing music. He stated in an interview that he was "really sh*t in high school" but was able to attend the University of Southern California by completing an audition. White performed with various artists in his teenage years such as Phoebe Bridgers in 2012.

Filmography

Film

Television

References

External links

21st-century American male actors
Living people
1996 births
American male film actors
American male television actors